Marco Chiudinelli and Teymuraz Gabashvili were the defending champions but chose not to defend their title.

Ruan Roelofse and John-Patrick Smith won the title after defeating Sanchai and Sonchat Ratiwatana 6–2, 6–3 in the final.

Seeds

Draw

References
 Main Draw
 Qualifying Draw

Gimcheon Open ATP Challenger - Doubles
2018 Doubles